Buenaventura Bagaria (1882 – 15 April 1947) was a Spanish sports shooter. He competed in the 50 m rifle, prone event at the 1932 Summer Olympics.

References

1882 births
1947 deaths
Spanish male sport shooters
Olympic shooters of Spain
Shooters at the 1932 Summer Olympics
20th-century Spanish people